Janusz Templin (December 14, 1928 – November 23, 1980), most commonly known as Jean Templin, was a French former football striker.

External links
 

1928 births
1980 deaths
French footballers
Association football forwards
Ligue 1 players
Stade de Reims players
RC Lens players
FC Villefranche Beaujolais players
FC Nancy players